John Dunlop (born March 1, 1975, in Milwaukee, Wisconsin, United States) is an American curler.

At the national level, he is a two-time United States men's curling champion (2000, 2008).

Teams

Personal life
John Dunlop is a fifth generation curler in his family. His great-grandfather, John M. Dunlop, was born in Ayr, Scotland, and his forefathers curled there for many generations. So, John can trace his curling roots back to the country widely recognized as the origin of the sport as we know it today. John's family was involved in the founding of the Wauwatosa and Milwaukee Curling Clubs in Wisconsin.

He started curling in 1986 at the age of 11.

References

External links
 

1975 births
Living people
Sportspeople from Milwaukee
Sportspeople from Madison, Wisconsin
American male curlers
American curling champions
Continental Cup of Curling participants
American people of Scottish descent